Miroslav Marcovich (March 18, 1919 – June 14, 2001) was a Serbian-American philologist and university professor.

Early life
Marcovich was born in Belgrade, Serbia. He studied at the University of Belgrade Faculty of Philosophy graduating in 1942. In 1943, he served as the assistant to Georg Ostrogorsky, an expert in Byzantine studies. He fought with the Yugoslav Partisans under Josip Broz Tito during World War II between 1944 and 1946. In 1953, he traveled to India where he began working at Visva-Bharati University.

Career
In 1955, he moved to Mérida and worked as a professor of Ancient Greek and philosophy from 1955 to 1962 at the University of the Andes, Venezuela. In 1962, he taught at the University of Bonn invited by Hans Herter. Between 1963 and 1968, he taught at the University of Cambridge. When classical scholar and paleographer Alexander Turyn—Professor at the University of Illinois—retired in 1969, Marcovich moved to Urbana, where he was the Head of the Department of Classics (1973–77), and taught there until his retirement in 1989. 

During those years he was a visiting professor at the University of Michigan, University of North Carolina, Trinity College, Dublin, and was an Albert Einstein Visiting Fellow in Tel Aviv. 

Marcovich also founded the Illinois Classical Studies journal, and served as its editor for 12 years.

Works
Marcovich focused his scholarship on textual criticism of philosophical and religious texts, mainly in Greek. He edited Heraclitus' fragments twice during his time in Cambridge, in 1967 (editio maior) and 1968 (editio minor); the former, he also translated in Italian in 1968 and has been reprinted without alterations in 2017. A prolific author, he published two collections of papers on ancient philosophy and religion—in 1965 and 1988. He had an uncommon breath of interests. At the beginning of his career, he edited the Davidiad by Marko Marulić (1957) and the Latin poems by Dalmatian poet and humanist Franjo Božičević (1958), both in first edition, and translated (in Spanish) and commented the Bhagavad-Gītā, one of the holy scriptures of Hinduism (1958). In 1985 he published a monograph on Greek tragic trimeter, and some years later two collection of studies on Greek poetry (1991) and on textual criticism of Patristic texts (1994).

Starting from his time in Cambridge, he became increasingly interested in Greek philosophy and Christianity, contributing to the Pauly-Wissowa with a monographic article on Heraclitus (1965) and editing, in addition to the aforementioned Heraclitus, Hippolytus' treatise "Refutation of All Heresies" (1968). He remained prolific in his late years after retirement, producing a long series of critical editions, mainly of Christian authors: Prosper of Aquitaine ("De providentia Dei", 1989), Athenagoras of Athens ("Legatio pro Christianis", 1990; "De resurrectione mortuorum" [sp.], 2000), Justin the Martyr ("Cohortatio ad Graecos", "De monarchia" and "Oratio ad Graecos" [all sp.], 1990; "Apologiae pro Christianis", 1994; "Dialogus cum Tryphone", 1997), Tatian ("Oratio ad Graecos", 1995), Theophilus of Antioch ("Ad Autolycum", 1995), Origen ("Contra Celsum", 2001) and Clement of Alexandria (“Protrepticus”, 1995; "Paedagogus", 2002 [published posthumously]). At the same time, he edited and commented the Alcestis Barcinoensis (1988) and produced three Teubner editions: Theodore Prodromos' "De Rhodante et Dosiclis amoribus" (1992), Diogenes Laërtius' "Lives and Opinions of Eminent Philosophers" (2-volumes set, 1999, which included unpublished Byzantine paraphrases; Hans Gärtner edited a volume of indexes in 2002) and Eustathios Makrembolites' "De Hysmines et Hysminiae amoribus libri XI" (2001 [published posthumously]).

During his lifetime Marcovich wrote and edited more than 30 books (not including the various issues of Illinois Classical Studies) and wrote 253 articles and essays in Spanish, German, Latin, Italian, French and Serbo-Croatian. At the beginning of his career, Marcovich also worked as a translator from German and Russian to Serbo-Croatian and published some textbooks (including Engels' The Evolution of Socialism).

Honours 
Marcovich was honored with an honorary doctorate degree in Humane Letters from the University of Illinois in 1994; and with two Festschriften published as monographic issues of the journal he founded, Illinois Classical Studies:

 
 

Other honors include the Silver Cross of Mount Athos (1963), a Guggenheim Fellowship (1983), a National Endowment of the Humanities Fellowship (1990) and an Albert Einstein Visiting Fellowship by the Israel Academy of Sciences (1993).

When he passed away, scholars Howard Jacobson and David Sansone published obituaries in his honor, and so did Fernando Báez, adding one in the reprint of Marcovich's edition of the Bhagavad-Gītā. Marcovich wrote his own epitaph in English, which some scholars translated in several languages including Ancient Greek and Latin (J. K. Newman), Hebrew (Howard Jacobson), Sahidic Coptic and Sanskrit (Gerald M. Browne) and Syriac (Sebastian Brock).

Personal
Marcovich died on 14 June, 2001 at the Carle Foundation Hospital, Urbana, Illinois.

Selected works 
Entries followed by [†] are posthumous. Marcovich's full bibliography, except for critical editions nos. 24 ad 25, can be read in:

Critical editions 
Entry no. 6 is an Italian translation of no. 5.

 
 
  
  
  
  
  
  
  
  
  
  
  
 
  
 
 
 
 
 
 
  [†]
  [†]
  [†]
  [†]
  [†]

Monographs 

 
 
 
 
 
 
 
  [†]

Translations and textbooks

Selected articles 
Journals are shortened according to the following sigla:

All entries are arranged chronologically and, for each year, alphabetically.

References

Sources
Fernando Báez, "Una Semblanza de Miroslav Marcovich" in Miroslav Marcovich, Bhagavadgita: El Canto del Señor (Mérida: ULA 2003).

See also
Sator Square, a subject Marcovich wrote papers on

External links
List of Marcovich's publications at the University of Illinois (Originally published in Illinois Classical Studies 18:1993, pp. 1-17). 
Blagoje Pantelich, Dijak Miroslav (in Serbian)

1919 births
2001 deaths
Writers from Belgrade
University of Illinois Urbana-Champaign faculty
University of Belgrade Faculty of Philosophy alumni
University of Michigan faculty
Academic staff of the University of the Andes (Venezuela)
Yugoslav expatriates in Venezuela
Yugoslav expatriates in the United Kingdom
Yugoslav emigrants to the United States
Yugoslav military personnel of World War II
Academics of the University of Cambridge
Serbian philologists